Lazare Saminsky, born Lazar Semyonovich Saminsky (Valehotsulove (now Dolynske), near Odessa, 27 October 1882 O.S. / 8 November N.S. – Port Chester, New York, 30 June 1959), was a performer, conductor and composer, especially of Jewish music.

Life
Born to a merchant family, Saminsky received a broad education in the arts, sciences and languages. He studied music at the Odessa conservatoire from 1903–1905, and then went to Moscow, where he studied mathematics and philosophy as well as music. Expelled for his participation in the student protests of 1905, he went to St.Petersburg, where he studied with Nikolai Rimsky-Korsakov, Anatoly Lyadov, and Nikolai Tcherepnin.

While still a student he became a founder member, with Mikhail Gnesin, Lyubov Streicher, and others, of the  'Society for Jewish Folk Music'. He wrote music for the Society and helped organise its earliest publication. He continued an active member, even though from 1911 to 1918 he lived in Tbilisi, where he also interested himself in Georgian and Armenian music, and from 1917 to 1918 he was head of the conservatory. During this period he also wrote an opera Tsar Yulian (Emperor Julian) (which he later destroyed), and researched Jewish music of the Caucasian region. He was particularly interested in styles of cantillation (nigun).

In 1919 Saminsky left the Soviet Union and travelled to France and England, where he gave recitals of Russian and Jewish music, and led a ballet season at the Duke of York's Theatre in London, where he married the poet Lillian Morgan (1893–1945). In December 1920 he left to settle in the United States, where he was active as a composer, conductor and organiser of musical events. In 1922 he became a board member of the International Composers Guild. In 1924 he was awarded a MacDowell fellowship, working in the Monday Music Studio. From 1924 he was music director of the Temple Emanu-El Synagogue in New York City. For the synagogue he composed  music for the Sabbath and Holiday services, also commissioning work from other Jewish composers including Joseph Achron and Isidor Freed.

Saminsky's major compositions include the First and Second Hebrew Song Cycles opp. 12 and 13 (written in 1914, published New York, 1922, text in Yiddish), songs, choral works, and piano pieces.

Saminsky wrote numerous books on Jewish music, contemporary music, and conducting.

Works
Operas: The Vision of Ariel (1916), Gagliarda of a Merry Plague (1925), The Daughter of Jepta (1929), Julian, the Apostate Caesar (1933–38),
Symphonies: No. 1, Of the Great Rivers (1914); No. 2, Symphonie des Sommets (1918); No. 3, Symphony of the Seas (1924); No. 4 (1927); No. 5, Jerusalem, City of Solomon and Christ, for chorus and orchestra (1932)
Orchestra: Vigiliae; Lament of Rachel; Venice; Ausonia; Three Shadows, Poems for Orchestra; Pueblo, A Moon Epic; Stilled Pageants
Solo with Orchestra: The Vow - Rhapsodic Variations for Piano and Orchestra (1917 ; rev. 1943); East and West, Suite for Violin and Orchestra
Vocal/Choral: To Zion, a Choral Fantasy; 4 Sacred Choruses; 10 Hebrew Folksongs and Folk Dances; 3 Hebrew Song Cycles; 6 Songs of the Russian Orient; Requiem, in memory of Lillian Saminsky; Sabbath Morning Service; Holiday Service; By the Rivers of Babylon

Sound
Shir hashirim (Song of songs) by Saminsky, sung by Emma Schaver

Recording
The Vow - Rhapsodic Variations for Piano and Orchestra (Barry Goldsmith/Royal Scottish National Orchestra/David Amos), CD, Kleos Classics (2005)

References

Sources
Grove Music Online, Saminsky, Lazare
 Beate Schröder-Nauenburg, Der Eintritt des Jüdischen in die Welt der Kunstmusik, Wiesbaden: Harrassowitz, 2007, pp. 151–208. 
 Baker's Biographical Dictionary of Musicians (Revised by Nicolas Slonimsky), G. Schirmer, NY, 1958, Saminsky, Lazare

External links
 Musica Judaica: page on Saminsky

1882 births
1959 deaths
Russian opera composers
Male opera composers
Odesa Jews
Russian male classical composers
Jewish classical composers
Musicians from Odesa
Emigrants from the Russian Empire to the United States
Emigrants from the Russian Empire to the United Kingdom
20th-century Russian male musicians